The 17th Annual American Music Awards were held on January 22, 1990, at the Shrine Auditorium, in Los Angeles, California. The awards recognized the most popular artists and albums from the year 1989.

Performances

Winners and nominees

References
 http://www.rockonthenet.com/archive/1990/amas.htm

1990